The Broken Bridge is a 1990 young adult novel by Philip Pullman. Set in Wales around Cardigan Bay, it tells the story of Ginny Howard, a young mixed-race girl, an aspiring artist, who discovers she has a half-brother and that her mother may still be alive.

Plot
Ginny is sixteen, life is great...
She’s turning out to be a brilliant artist like her mother-who died when she was a baby-she loves her home by the sea and, best of all, Andy has come back for the summer. But Ginny’s perfect world is about to shatter. 
Her father has kept a devastating secret from her and, piece by piece, she discovers that everything he has told her about herself is a lie. So who is she? Ginny must return to the dark tragedies of the past to find out.

References

1990 British novels
Novels by Philip Pullman
British young adult novels
Novels set in Wales
Cardigan Bay
Macmillan Publishers books
1990 children's books